Charlotte Parish may refer to:
Charlotte Parish, Prince Edward Island, Canada
Charlotte Parish, Saint Vincent and the Grenadines